A resonator is a device or system that naturally oscillates at some frequencies.

Resonator may also refer to:

Electronics
 Ceramic resonator
 Dielectric resonator antenna
 Piezoelectric resonator (disambiguation)
 Split-ring resonator
 Thin-film bulk acoustic resonator

Music
 Resonators (band), a British dub reggae band

Albums
 Resonator (Kathryn Williams album), 2016
 Resonator (Tony Levin album), 2006
 Resonator (Pioneer of Sound), by Gary Numan, 2004
 Resonator, by Tom Rothrock, 2007

Instruments
 Acoustic resonator
 Resonator dulcimer
 Resonator guitar
 Resonator mandolin
 Resonator ukulele

See also
 Resonance (disambiguation)
 Resonate (disambiguation)
 Resonating valence bond theory
 Vocal resonation